Harold Radford & Co Limited of Melton Court, South Kensington, London SW7, (opposite South Kensington tube station and now Lamborghini London) were long-established retailers of Rolls-Royce and Bentley cars who, under G H Radford, developed a bespoke coach building business in the late 1940s named Harold Radford (Coachbuilders) Limited. The coachbuilding business began by making bodies for new Bentleys with amendments to suit the rural lifestyle of the landed gentry. In the Swinging Sixties Radfords became best known for luxury versions of the cult-car, Mini.

In 2021, Radford was relaunched to once again play a leading role in creating bespoke global luxury cars. The revered brand has been brought back by TV presenter and car builder Ant Anstead, former Formula One World Champion, Jenson Button, and leading business adviser and lawyer Roger Behle.

The marque is being revived to create contemporary luxury commissions true to classic timeless designs, bringing a modern and relevant version of Radford coachbuilding, to a new discerning clientele.

Bentley Countryman

A luxurious town car, shooting brake, and Continental tourer in one vehicle. The Countryman car was available from Harold Radford with a full Radford body incorporating what was otherwise a conversion.

After the introduction of the "big boot" model in 1952 standard steel Bentleys and Rolls-Royces, usually new but already registered in their owner's name and driven to avoid extra purchase tax, would be given as much of the total conversion as the customer required. Conversions featured the following:

 Upper rear panel, including rear light (back window), hinges upward to give exceptionally easy entry to boot.
 Front and rear seats fold down together to form a full six foot double bed. Sprung upholstery, with Latex foam, gives comfort of normal bed.
 Tables with mirrors fold down from front seats. Rear armrests slide forward to reveal fitted cocktail cabinets and to form a table for glasses.
 Luggage compartment gives 40 cubic feet of storage space — 4 times capacity of normal coach built saloon.
 Every conceivable item of equipment that can add to the comfort and convenience of passengers has been included.
 Body colours, trimmings and the finish of interior fillets and facias made to customer's choice.
 Equipment includes: electric razor, washbasin with hot and cold water supply, an ice box and an electric kettle, Silver Dawn £5,710, Bentley £5,497.
 A strong mesh dog pen protecting upholstery  now (October 1962) brings the number of modifications to fifty.

Mini de Ville and 1100

The motoring correspondent of The Times reported in May 1963 the Mini while a popular second car in many households was no longer strictly the fashion, the Grande Luxe Mini de Ville by Radford had taken over.

On test in London, he reported, it attracted more attention than a Ferrari Berlinetta with its special colour scheme and trim, sliding sun roof, radiator grille with two more recessed lights, special sound insulation and electric windows (this was when normal Mini windows in the doors slid one half over the other).

The car tested by The Times also had white leather upholstery and deep lambswool carpets, tachometer, ammeter, oil gauge, clock, headlamp flasher (vital) and water temperature gauge. Further extras were: a laminated wood steering wheel to maintain firm grip (by soaking up sweat), automatic red caution lights on open doors, a reading light, cigar lighter, twin-speaker radio and an air blower to demist the rear window.

After the 1967 Earls Court Motor Show The Times tried to display in print why a Mini de Ville should be preferred to, say, an Alfa Giulia GTV, Porsche 912 or Lotus Elan +2. They recorded that Captains of Industry ordered them, painted them to match their Rolls and gave them to their wives. Pop Stars and West End playboys presumably invested in them as a status symbol.

The reporter tested "a typical Mini de Ville", a 1275 Mini-Cooper S with an engine performance pack providing up to about 110 m.p.h. Outwardly the only distinction was the magnesium alloy wheels, sunroof and non-standard paint. Inside absolutely everything seemed like a refugee from a Rolls-Royce. There were, in total, 63 extras advised Radford. The tester noted noise levels were typically Mini-Cooper in spite of the sound-deadening materials and that Radfords continued to have a waiting list.

Aston Martin DB5 Shooting Brakes 

Radfords converted a number of Aston Martins to estate cars under contract to Aston Martin.

Owner of Aston Martin and founder of the ‘DB’ name, David Brown, found that his DB5 was a tight fit when he tried to carry his polo equipment, his hunting gear and his dogs. So he requested that the factory create a shooting brake for his own personal use. And this is where the DB5 shooting brake begins.

However, on seeing David Brown's unique Aston Martin, a few Aston Martin customers also wanted one. At that time, the factory was busy just making the DB5 coupe, so David Brown made an arrangement with Harold Radford to make continue making DB5 shooting brakes to meet the demand. 

Radford was already experienced in building the not dissimilar Bentley Countryman shooting brakes. The conversion for the DB5 was extensive and affected the whole car from the windscreen backwards. The rear hatchback was a single piece hinged from the top and assisted by springs.

The interior was cleverly designed to hold as much as luggage as possible. With the rear seat folded down, the car offered an uninterrupted load space of 1.75 metres by 1.05 metres and a volume of 1.1 cubic metres making it a practical and fast load lugger.

As the mechanical and chassis specification of the car remained the same as when first built, the car was still claimed to reach 150mph and was marketed as ‘The world’s fastest dual-purpose vehicle’. Radford also claimed the Shooting Brake would be able to brake from 100mph to a standstill in six seconds.

Each shooting brake began life as a completely finished saloon, priced at £4,412. The price of a finished shooting brake incurred an additional cost of £2,000 when ordered through Aston Martin. In some cases, customers also sent pre-registered cars to Radford for conversion. Only 12 DB5 shooting brakes were built (8 RHD and 4 LHD), all of which are believed to survive, making them the rarest DB5 variant.

Following on from the DB5 Shooting Brake, Radford went on to build similar cars based on the DB6.

Ford GT40 Prototype 
Radford was also involved with the original Ford GT40 project.

After 1965, and a slow start to the GT40’s LeMans career, FIA rules and regulations were changed for the 1966 season. In order to qualify for the ’66 season Ford needed to create 50 homologation models of the GT40 within 12 consecutive months. Using the prototype Lola coupé with a Ford V8 engine and a Colotti gearbox as a basis, the Ford GT coupé was created. The cars were made and built in England by British craftsmen and mechanics in a factory on the Slough Trading Estate, to the West of London.

This steel chassis/body unit of the prototype cars was made by Abbey Panels Ltd of Coventry and it arrived at Slough in a bare and unpainted form, where front and rear sub-frames were fitted for carrying the body panels. Then the unit was sent to Harold Radford Ltd, where the fibreglass doors, the rear engine-hatch (which forms the complete tail of the car), and the front nosepiece (which is a single moulding) are fabricated to fit the body and set aside and retained for the car in question.

The fibreglass components were made by Glass Fibre Engineering of Farnham, Surrey and delivered to Slough in a bare unpainted state. When the chassis/body unit is returned from Radford, the factory at Slough assembled all of the suspension parts, steering, wiring, engine and gearbox. The then nearly completed car then would go back to Radford for final trimming of the interior, seats and glass before it was painted in the colour required by the customer.

Stirling Moss "dream car"
Harold Radford (Coachbuilders) were to build the Cortina-Ogle GT which was presented at the 1963 Earls Court Motor Show by Stirling Moss.

Ownership
As a member of the H R Owen group (itself since October 1959 a member of the Swain group owned by The Provincial Traction Company Limited) from March 1961 the activities of Harold Radford (Coachbuilders) Limited were rolled in with servicing and body repair operations of H R Owen and Swain under the Harold Radford (Coachbuilders) Limited name.

In late 1963 Harold Radford (Coachbuilders), with Swain and H R Owen, was acquired by a City syndicate.

Though it continued to trade Harold Radford (Coachbuilders) Limited was placed in voluntary liquidation in September 1966 because it was unable to meet its liabilities. A new company, Harold Radford Coachbuilders (1967) Limited, was formed in October 1967 to acquire and continue and improve the car conversion business and it took control of the business on 10 October 1967.

Today, Radford is co-owned by Ant Anstead, Jenson Button and Roger Behle under the company name Finest Coachbuilding Group (FCG) which is a United States Limited Liability Company (LLC). The group also has UK holdings which are entirely owned by FCG.

References

 The Sydney Morning Herald - 21 Apr 1958 page 5 British Cars Star At New York Show
 New York Times 6 Apr 1958 LUXURY MODELS, TOO; German, French, Italian, British Cars Join US

External links

 Aston Martin DB5 Radford Shooting Brake

Radford